Talluri Rameswari (also known as Rameswari) is an Indian actress who worked in Hindi, Odia and Telugu language films.

Early life
She was born and raised in Andhra Pradesh and spent her childhood in Kakinada.

Career
Rameswari graduated from FTII in 1975. She got her big break in 1977 with Rajshri's Dulhan Wahi Jo Piya Man Bhaye. The movie turned was a phenomenal hit and made her a household name. In 1978 she played the title role in K. Viswanath's Seetamalakshmi (Telugu) for which she received the Filmfare Award for Best Actress - Telugu. Some of her other notable films include Sunayana with Naseeruddin Shah, Mera Rakshak with Mithun, and Sharda and Aasha with Jeetendra. The latter earned her a Filmfare Nomination as Best Supporting Actress.  In addition to Hindi and Telugu she has also acted in Odia and Malayalam movies.

Personal life
Rameswari married her FTII classmate and pal, Punjabi actor-producer Deepak Seth and has two sons Bhaskara Pratap Seth and Surya Prem Seth. She took a sabbatical from acting to raise her children and returned to acting in the 2000s playing mature roles. She and her husband produced a Hindi film titled Hum Farishte Nahin (1988) and a Punjabi film titled Mein Tuun Assin Tussin (2007) based on the Shakespeare play The Comedy of Errors. Lately, she has been working in television series.

Filmography

Television series
 America Ammayi
Kairi
 Mitwa Phool Kamal Ke
 Jabb Love Hua
 Babul Ka Aangann Chootey Na
 Padosi (1985)
 Chamatkar
 Ados Pados (TV Serial)
 Nanhi Si Kali Meri Laadli (TV serial aired on DD National)
 ‘’ Jhansi ‘’ (Disney+ Hotstar)

Movies

References

External links
 

Living people
Filmfare Awards South winners
20th-century Indian actresses
21st-century Indian actresses
Telugu actresses
Nandi Award winners
Actresses from Andhra Pradesh
People from Kakinada
Indian television actresses
Actresses in Hindi television
Indian film actresses
Actresses in Telugu cinema
Actresses in Telugu television
Year of birth missing (living people)
Actresses in Malayalam cinema
Actresses in Hindi cinema
Actresses in Odia cinema